Grace Geraldine English (1891-4 December 1956) was a British painter and etcher.

Biography
English was born in London and as a teenager spent time in Paris and Germany. In Germany she met I. A. R. Wylie and produced illustrations for her book on the Black Forest.  Returning to London in 1912 she studied at the Slade School of Art in the city until 1914. At the Slade she won a painting prize. During World War I, English worked in a munitions factory and also produced machine drawings. After the war she studied etching at the Royal College of Art during 1921. Throughout her career English painted portraits, flowers and ballet dancers. She was a regular exhibitor at the Royal Academy and at the New English Art Club and with the Royal Society of British Artists and the Royal Society of Portrait Painters. Leeds City Art Gallery holds examples of her work.

References

External links
 

1891 births
1956 deaths
20th-century English painters
20th-century English women artists
Alumni of the Royal College of Art
Alumni of the Slade School of Fine Art
Artists from London
English women painters